Douglas George Ball  (19 October 1895 – 8 February 1986) was a New Zealand teacher, school inspector and educational administrator. He was born in Wanganui, New Zealand, on 19 October 1895.

In the 1946 New Year Honours, Ball was appointed an Officer of the Order of the British Empire. In 1953, he was awarded the Queen Elizabeth II Coronation Medal, and in 1957 he was appointed an Officer of the Order of St John.

References

1895 births
1986 deaths
People from Whanganui
New Zealand educators
School inspectors
New Zealand Officers of the Order of the British Empire
Officers of the Order of St John